Welsleben is a former municipality in the district of Salzlandkreis, in Saxony-Anhalt, Germany. Since January 2008, it is part of the municipality Bördeland.

See also

Former municipalities in Saxony-Anhalt
Bördeland